Goraj may refer to the following places:
Goraj, Albania
Goraj, Greater Poland Voivodeship (west-central Poland)
Góraj, Greater Poland Voivodeship (west-central Poland)
Goraj, Lublin Voivodeship (east Poland)
Goraj, Lubusz Voivodeship (west Poland)
Goraj, Pomeranian Voivodeship (north Poland)